The Southern Cross of Honor was a commemorative medal established in 1899 by the United Daughters of the Confederacy to honor Confederate Veterans.

Design
The Cross of Honor is in the form of a cross pattée suspended from a metal bar with space for engraving. It has no cloth ribbon. The obverse displays the Confederate battle flag placed on the center thereof surrounded by a wreath, with the inscription UNITED DAUGHTERS [of the] CONFEDERACY TO THE U. C. V. (the UCV is the United Confederate Veterans) on the four arms of the cross. The reverse of the Cross of Honor is the motto of the Confederate States, DEO VINDICE ([With] God [as] our Vindicator) and the dates 1861 1865 also surrounded by a laurel wreath. The arms of the cross bear the inscription SOUTHERN CROSS OF HONOR.

History 

The Cross of Honor was conceived by Mary Ann Erwin, daughter of Confederate politician Howell Cobb, in 1898. 
 She and Sarah E. Gabbett designed it. The first medal was issued on April 26, 1900, to Erwin's husband, Captain Alexander S. Erwin by the Athens (Georgia) Chapter. 

Charles W. Crankshaw of Atlanta, Georgia, was chosen as the contractor to produce the medal.  Its first manufacturer was Schwaab Stamp & Seal Co. of Milwaukee, Wisconsin. In 1904 the contract was shifted to Whitehead & Hoag of Newark, New Jersey.

Anna Davenport Raines was the Custodian of Crosses of Honor until her death in 1913. Though intended to end in 1913, after the issuance of 78,761 medals, in 1912 it was extended indefinitely. The program finally ended in 1959.

Eligibility and allocation 
The Cross of Honor could only be bestowed through the United Daughters of the Confederacy. It could not be purchased; it was given in recognition of loyal, honorable service to the South and only a Confederate veteran could wear it. It was available to any branch of the Confederate military. Only living veterans were eligible. However the final award was given posthumously, in 1951 to Rear Adm. Raphael Semmes. At least 78,761 were awarded.

Although no Civil War veterans are still living, the last verified Confederate veteran dying in 1951, Virginia Code section 18.2-176(b) remains in effect and makes it a Class 3 misdemeanor, punishable by a fine of not more than US$500, to "wear any Southern Cross of Honor when not entitled to do so by the regulations under which such Crosses of Honor are given." An unofficial analog of the Union's GAR Medal, its wearing was never authorized on U.S. military uniforms.

Headstones and markers 
The Cross of Honor is also used as an emblem or marker on the graves of Confederate veterans. It will only be issued by the Department of Veterans Affairs to be placed on graves of Confederate veterans.

Gallery

See also
Lists of awards

References

Further reading

External links

 A Guide to the United Daughters of the Confederacy, Southern Cross of Honor Records, 1905-1941 at James Madison University 
 Unidentified Civil War veteran in United Confederate Veterans uniform with Southern Cross of Honor medal at the Library of Congress

1899 establishments in the United States
Awards established in 1899
Awards disestablished in 1959
Service awards
United Confederate Veterans
United Daughters of the Confederacy